Doshin may refer to:

Doshin the Giant, a Nintendo god simulation game for the Nintendo 64DD and GameCube
Doshin So (1911–1980), creator and founder of Shorinji Kempo, a Japanese martial art
Onmitsu Dōshin Ōedo Sōsamō, a prime-time Japanese television jidaigeki program
Hokkaidō Shimbun - The abbreviation is Dōshin (道新). Regional newspaper in Hokkaidō, Japan